Tynemouth is a Tyne and Wear Metro station, serving the coastal town of Tynemouth, North Tyneside in Tyne and Wear, England. It joined the network as a terminus station on 11 August 1980, following the opening of the first phase of the network, between Haymarket and Tynemouth via Four Lane Ends.

History 
The station, designed by architect William Bell, was originally opened by the North Eastern Railway on 7 July 1882. It was designated as a Grade II* listed building on 2 November 1978.

Following a significant decline in the number of passengers using the North Eastern Railway's services in North Tyneside during the early 1900s, the line was electrified as part of the Tyneside Electrics network, using a 600VDC third-rail system.

Owing to falling passenger numbers during the 1960s, as well as rising costs, and the need to renew life expired infrastructure and rolling stock, the Tyneside Electrics network was de-electrified and converted to diesel multiple unit operation in 1967.

The station has remained in constant use since opening, with British Rail continuing to use the station's former bay platforms for services from Newcastle via Wallsend until the day before the first section of the Tyne and Wear Metro opened.

Tynemouth joined the Tyne and Wear Metro network on 11 August 1980, with the opening of the first phase of the network between Haymarket and Tynemouth via Four Lane Ends.  Prior to the introduction of through services to St James via Wallsend on 14 November 1982, all trains used the present platform 2.

Regeneration 
In 2007, English Heritage placed the station on the Heritage at Risk Register. The survey is used by national and local government, a wide range of individuals and heritage groups to establish the extent of risk and to help assess priorities for action and funding decisions. 

Work on the £3.68million regeneration project began in early 2011, and was completed in the following year. On 2 July 2012, the station was officially reopened by Anne, Princess Royal, and subsequently removed from the register.

Facilities
The station has two platforms, both of which have ticket machines (which accept cash, card and contactless payment), seating, next train audio and visual displays, timetable and information posters and an emergency help point.

There is step-free access to both platforms by road bridge, with platforms also linked by a pre-grouping wooden footbridge, which is similar in design to that at nearby Cullercoats.

The station has a pay and display car park, with 71 spaces. There is also cycle storage at the station, with four cycle pods and five Sheffield stands.

Services 
, the station is served by up to five trains per hour on weekdays and Saturday, and up to four trains per hour during the evening and on Sunday.

Rolling stock used: Class 599 Metrocar

Market
A weekly market is held at the station every Saturday and Sunday, which doubles as a farmers' market once a month. The Friends of Tynemouth Station also hold book fairs several times a year at the station. The first book fair took place in August 1993.

Notes

References

External links
 
 Timetable and station information for Tynemouth

Grade II* listed buildings in Tyne and Wear
Grade II* listed railway stations
Railway stations in Great Britain opened in 1882
Railway stations in Great Britain opened in 1980
Tynemouth
William Bell railway stations
Former North Eastern Railway (UK) stations
Structures formerly on the Heritage at Risk register